The Ayodhya firing describes the occasion when the Uttar Pradesh police opened fire at civilians on two separate days, 30October 1990 and 2November 1990, in the aftermath of the Ram Rath Yatra. The civilians were religious volunteers, or kar sevaks, assembled near the Ram Janmabhoomi site at Ayodhya.
The state government's official records report that 50  people were killed.

Background
In September 1990 the Vishwa Hindu Parishad (VHP), the Rashtriya Swayamsevak Sangh (RSS) and the Shiv Sena campaigned for the Ram Temple to be rebuilt at the Ram Janmabhoomi site. The situation became volatile, with L. K. Advani conducting rath yatra and the VHP mobilizing people to the site. The state government, under Mulayam Singh Yadav, promised protection and a complete lockdown of the site and city. Yadav reassured the public: "No bird would be able to fly into Ayodhya".

Timeline

21 October 1990
Volunteers, or kar sevaks first assembled in Ayodhya, at the behest of L. K. Advani of the BJP and Ashok Singhal of the VHP, on 21October 1990.

30 October 1990
Called "the D-Day of Karseva" 30October saw the start of unprecedented security arrangements. Police barred all bus and train services to Ayodhya. Most kar sevaks reached Ayodhya by foot; some swam across the Sarayu river. The police also barricaded the 1.5 km-long climb to the disputed structure and imposed a curfew. According to the investigatory Liberhan Commission report, issued after the event:
 28,000 Uttar Pradesh Provincial Armed Constabulary personnel were deployed in Ayodhya
 Out of 40,000 kar sevaks, only 10,000 managed to reach Ayodhya

At around 10am, a large group of kar sevaks headed towards the site, led by Vamadev, Mahant Nritya Gopal Das, and Ashok Singhal of the VHP. Ashok Singhal was wounded on the head by a police baton. This altercation led to a mob frenzy and open confrontation between civilians and policemen.

At around 11am, a Hindu holyman or sadhu managed to gain control of an Armed Constabulary bus in which the police were holding detainees. The sadhu drove the bus right through the barricades, clearing a way for the others to follow on foot. The security forces were caught off guard and were forced to chase about 5,000 kar sevaks, who stormed through the heavily guarded site. According to eyewitnesses the Kothari brothers mounted a saffron flag atop the Babri Masjid.

1 November 1990
Hindu groups took a day to cremate and pay homage to the lives lost on 1November.

2 November 1990
Assembled kar sevaks offered prayers(Pooja) at Ramlila on the morning of 2November and then proceeded to Babri Masjid. Members of the crowd used the strategy of touching security personnel's feet, which made them withdraw a step. This worked for a while, and the procession continued. However, the police took firm action by using tear gas and baton charges to disperse the crowd. Nevertheless, some contingents of kar sevaks reached and partially damaged the mosque.

In response the police opened fire for the second time in 72 hours, and chased kar sevaks through the alleys around Hanumangarhi. In one place, later named Shaheed Gali or Martyr's Alley, police killed many kar sevaksthis included the Kothari Brothers, who were allegedly dragged out of a house.

Some Indians have accused the police of disposing of many dead bodies, either by cremating them at unknown places or by dumping them into the Saryu River in sacks.

Deaths
List of killed karsevaks and their city of residence:
 The Kothari Brothers (Kolkata)
 Setharam Mali (Jodhpur)
 Ramesh Kumar (Ganganagar)
 Mahavir Prasad (Faizabad)
 Ramesh Pandey (Ayodhya)
 Sanjay Kumar (Muzaffarpur)
 Professor Mahendranath Arora (Jodhpur)
 An unnamed sadhu
 Rajendra Dharkar
 Babulal Tiwari (from the village of Nemavar)

Wounded survivors
Wounded survivors of the attack included:
 Sangram Keshari Mohapatra (Odisha)
 Sunil Kumar
 Rajnarain Singh (Sultanpur)
 Vishwajeet (Patel Nagar, Delhi)
 Rambahadur (Badayun)
 Abhay Kumar (Asansol)

Aftermath
News of the shootings was mostly suppressed from the Indian media, but some local and international media outlets mentioned them. The firing incident had a major impact on Uttar Pradesh and on Indian national politics.

The Chief Minister of Uttar Pradesh was given the sobriquet ‘Mulla’ Mulayam Singh for his pro-muslim stance during the incident. He lost the 1991 election to the Bharatiya Janata Party. he described his decision to fire on the crowd in Ayodhya as "painful yet necessary as it was ordered by the high court to maintain peace, law and order till the judgement come out ."

People of the Hindu community arranged a memorial meeting for the dead Karsevaks on April4, 1991 at the Boat Club, New Delhi, which attracted a large audience. They also launched a nationwide awareness program displaying the Asthi Kalash (funeral urns) of those who died in the firing incident. In the following years, these organizations and their prominent leaders received both political and moral endorsement.

On6 December 1992, a large group of kar sevaks completely demolished Babri Masjid.

References

Ayodhya dispute
Vishva Hindu Parishad
1990 in India
1990s in Uttar Pradesh
Deaths by firearm in India